David Philip Brody is an American commentator for the Christian Broadcasting Network.  Brody is also known for his vocal support of Donald Trump

Brody was born in New Jersey on February 13, 1965, and grew up in New York City. He was raised Reform Jewish, with his sister Karen Rachel but he notes neither of his parents were very religious. He converted to Evangelical Christianity in his 20s.

Brody graduated from Ithaca College (Ithaca, NY) in 1987 with a Bachelor of Science degree in communications. He was News Director at ABC affiliate KRDO-TV, Colorado Springs, Colorado.

David Brody is married to Lisette Dorianne Bassett-Brody. Together, they have three children; Andrew, Aaron, and Elina Brody.

Brody wrote the 2012 book The Teavangelicals: The Inside Story of How the Evangelicals and the Tea Party are Taking Back America. Brody co-authored the book The Faith of Donald J. Trump: A Spiritual Biography, with Scott Lamb of The Washington Times, and it was published in early 2018.

References

External links 

 The Brody File Blog
 Biography on Christian Broadcasting Network website

American television reporters and correspondents
Emmy Award winners
Living people
1965 births
American bloggers
Ithaca College alumni
Converts to evangelical Christianity
American evangelicals
21st-century American non-fiction writers